Remix 2000 is the re-release of the Multimedia Remix album by Mushroomhead from 1997. It features four new remixed tracks and the videos from the original release have been omitted. Alternate artwork was also included with this re-release.

Track listing
"43" (Sonar Mix)
"Elevation" (Skin Mix)
"2nd Thoughts" (Fuck Like Pigs Mix)
"Snap" (Gravy Mix)
"Mommy" (Malfunction Mix)
"Everyone's Got One" (Only Mix)
"The Wrist" (Hand of Solo Mix)
"Episode 29" (Hardcore Mix)
"Too Much Nothing" (Too Many Days in The Studio Mix)
"Mommy" (No Vocal Mix)
"Bwomp" (Nord Mix)

Mushroomhead albums
2002 remix albums